Paraguay first competed in the 1968 Olympic Games which was held in Mexico City, Mexico, and has sent athletes to compete in every Summer Olympic Games since then, except when they boycotted the 1980 Summer Olympics in Moscow. They competed in the Winter Olympics for the first time in 2014, which were held in Sochi.

The nation has only ever won one medal, the silver in the men's football in 2004, where they lost 1-0 to Argentina in the final in Athens.

Medal tables

Medals by Summer Games

Medals by Winter Games

Medals by sport

List of medalists

See also
 List of flag bearers for Paraguay at the Olympics
 Tropical nations at the Winter Olympics

External links
 
 
 

 
Olympics